"All Your Reasons" is a song from Matchbox Twenty's fourth album, Exile on Mainstream. It was released in Australia as the second single from the album, while in the rest of the world, "These Hard Times" was released as the second single.

Track listing
 "All Your Reasons" (album version) – 2:40
 "How Far We've Come" (Remix #1) – 3:50
 "Disease" (Live from Blueroom) – 3:36

Personnel
Rob Thomas - lead vocals
Kyle Cook - electric guitar, mandolin, backing vocals
Paul Doucette - acoustic guitar, backing vocals
Brian Yale - bass
Ryan MacMillan - drums

Charts

Awards and nominations

APRA Award
2009 Most Played Foreign Work win for "All Your Reasons" written by Kyle Cook, Rob Thomas, Paul Doucette, Brian Yale presented by Australasian Performing Right Association.

References

External links
 Warner Music

2007 songs
2008 singles
APRA Award winners
Atlantic Records singles
Matchbox Twenty songs
Song recordings produced by Steve Lillywhite
Songs written by Brian Yale
Songs written by Kyle Cook
Songs written by Paul Doucette
Songs written by Rob Thomas (musician)

ca:Matchbox Twenty
de:Matchbox twenty
es:Matchbox Twenty
fr:Matchbox 20
gl:Matchbox Twenty
ko:매치박스 트웬티
nl:Matchbox twenty
ja:マッチボックス・トゥエンティ
uz:Matchbox Twenty
pt:Matchbox Twenty
ru:Matchbox twenty
simple:Matchbox Twenty
fi:Matchbox Twenty
sv:Matchbox Twenty
tr:Matchbox twenty